Events from the year 1823 in Sweden

Incumbents
 Monarch – Charles XIV John

Events

 13 June - Queen Désirée Clary return to Sweden after twelve years of exile in the company of her son's bride, Josephine of Leuchtenberg.
 19 June - The wedding between Crown Prince Oscar and Josephine of Leuchtenberg in Stockholm.
 Magasin för konst, nyheter och moder, the first Swedish fashion magazine, is published.

Births

 6 July – Sophie Adlersparre
 25 July – Albert Lindhagen
  – Rosalie Roos
  – Thérèse Elfforss, actress and theater manager   (died 1905)

Deaths

 3 April – Erik Johan Stagnelius
 15 April – Louis Deland
  – Magdalena Rudenschöld

References

 
Years of the 19th century in Sweden
Sweden